Horse Creek is a stream in Stone County in the Ozarks of southwest Missouri. It is a tributary of the James River.

Horse Creek was so named on account of wild horses in the area.

See also
List of rivers of Missouri

References

Rivers of Stone County, Missouri
Rivers of Missouri